The 2015–16 season was the 127th season of competitive football by Celtic. They competed in the Scottish Premiership, League Cup and the Scottish Cup. They also competed in the Europa League, having been eliminated in the play-off round of the Champions League.

Results and fixtures

Pre-season and friendlies

Scottish Premiership

UEFA Champions League

Second qualifying round

Third qualifying round

Play-Off Round

UEFA Europa League

Group stage

Scottish League Cup

Scottish Cup

Player statistics

Squad, appearances and goals

Goalscorers

Last updated: 15 May 2016
Europe:

Disciplinary Record
Includes all competitive matches. Players listed below made at least one appearance for Celtic first squad during the season.

Team statistics

League table

Results by round

Competition Overview

League results summary

Technical staff

 to September 2015Davie McGovern

Transfers

Transfers in

Transfers out

Total income:  £14 million

Total expenditure:  £8.275 million

Total profit/loss:  £5.725 million

See also
 List of Celtic F.C. seasons
Nine in a row

References

Celtic F.C. seasons
Scottish football championship-winning seasons
Celtic
Celtic